Larix lyallii, the subalpine larch, or simply alpine larch, is a deciduous, coniferous tree native to northwestern North America. There is a disjunct population in the Cascade Range of Washington.

Subalpine larch is hardy and can survive at low temperatures and on thin rocky soils, often being found near the tree line. It can grow in a variety of soils as long as the soil is moist but well drained. However, it is relatively shade intolerant.

David Lyall seems to have discovered the species between 1858 and 1861. John Bernhard Leiberg described it in 1900.

Description

It has a straight trunk with a sparse and somewhat conical crown. The branches are horizontal, perpendicular to the trunk, irregularly spaced and twisted. The twigs are finely hairy. They are pale blue-green and deciduous, turning golden yellow in autumn.

They have thin scales and narrow bracts that extend over the scales. The pollen and seed cones become active in early summer. The bark is about 2.5 cm thin and turns from yellow-gray to dark red-brown with age. It also becomes deeply furrowed into small, scaly plates.

The tree is also one of the longest-lived tree species. There is record of a specimen in Kananaskis, Alberta, which has been understood to be about 2,000 years old, the oldest tree in Canada.

Uses
The bark contains tannin and the wood is strong, heavy, and durable.

References

External links

 Gymnosperm Database: Larix lyallii
 Virginia Tech Dendrology: Larix lyallii
 Treelib.ca: Larix lyalii

lyallii
Least concern flora of the United States
Trees of Alberta
Trees of British Columbia
Trees of the Northwestern United States
Flora of the Rocky Mountains
Deciduous conifers
Trees of North America
Trees of the United States
Trees of Canada
Trees of Western Canada